Kim Raynor is a former American football coach.  He served as the head football coach at Sterling College in Sterling, Kansas for four seasons, from 1990 to 1993, compiling a record 13–26.

Head coaching record

References

Year of birth missing (living people)
Living people
Sterling Warriors football coaches